JSS Private School (Jagadguru Sri Shivarathreeshwara Swamikal Maha Vidyalaya Private School) is a CBSE  co-educational school located in Al Safa, Dubai, United Arab Emirates. It offers education from Pre-kindergarten until Grade 12 and follows the CBSE curriculum aiming to promote critical and creative thinking in a holistic development model. The school was established in 2011, and is a part of JSS Mahavidyapeetha, a campus which runs a variety of educational institutes in India and the United Arab Emirates. This school has another affiliated branch called JSS International School, Dubai.

Campus 
The JSSPS Campus is split into two distinct areas. One housing the pre-kg, kindergarten, primary & middle school, the inclusion and pastoral care section, the school clinic, the junior ICT lab and the auditorium. The other housing the secondary school, the canteen the ICT center, and 3 science laboratories. 

The school offers an array of indoor and outdoor sports activities and facilities through a temperature controlled swimming pool, cricket nets, soccer field with a grass court, basketball court, lawn tennis courts, volleyball court, boxing, and chess. Kindergarten students also have access to an outdoor play area.

KHDA Inspection Report 
The Knowledge and Human Development Authority (KHDA) is an education authority based in Dubai, United Arab Emirates. It undertakes early learning, school and higher learning institution management and rates them, based on the performance of both the teachers and the students.

A summary of the inspection ratings for JSS Private School:

References

External links 

Schools in Dubai
Indian international schools in the United Arab Emirates